Manuel Sánchez Arcas (1897–1970) was a Spanish Modernist architect. During the Spanish Civil War (1936–1939) he served in the Republican government as Undersecretary for Propaganda. After the Republican defeat he went into exile in Moscow, Warsaw and Berlin.

Life

Early years: 1897–1936

Manuel Sánchez Arcas was born in Madrid in 1897.
He studied at the Madrid School of Architecture (Escuela de Arquitectura de Madrid), and graduated in 1921.
He went to London for further studies.
On his return to Spain he first worked with Secundino Zuazo, then from 1925 worked alone.
He was one of the architects known as the "1925 generation" that tried to introduce avant-garde Modernist concepts into Spain.

Modesto López Otero was the director for the Madrid University City (Ciudad Universitaria de Madrid) project. 
He formed a diverse team of young architects to design the various buildings, including Sánchez Arcas.
Sánchez Arcas and Jesús Martí Martín  designed a new building for the Center for Historical Studies.
The engineer Eduardo Torroja joined the group in 1929. 
He worked with Sánchez Arcas, sharing his interest in new architectural forms that rejected preconceived formulas.
The first collaborative work of Torroja and Sanchez Arcas was the pavilion of the Construction Commission of the university city, completed in June 1931.
They worked on the heating plant (Central Térmica) and the clinical hospital for the university city. Sánchez Arcas and Torroja designed an enclosed and semi-spherical shell for the 1932 Algeciras market hall.
As an engineering work it is considered Torroja's masterpiece.

Sánchez Arcas and Torroja founded the journal Hormigón y Acero (Concrete and Steel).
In 1934 they founded the Instituto Técnico de la Construcción y Edificación (ITCE, Technical Institute of Construction and Building).
Other founding members were the architect Modesto López Otero (1885–1962) and the engineers José María Aguirre Gonzalo (1897–1988) and Alfonso Peña Boeuf (1888–1966). 
The ITCE was a non-profit organization dedicated to developing and applying technical innovations in engineering civil structures.

Civil War: 1936–1939

Sánchez Arcas became a dedicated member of the Spanish Communist Party (PCE).
The Spanish Civil War began in July 1936 with the rebellion of Nationalists led by Francisco Franco.
With the approach of Nationalist troops to Madrid in early November 1936 the government of Prime Minister Francisco Largo Caballero was restructured to include the anarchists Joan Peiró (Industry), Juan López Sánchez (Commerce) and Federica Montseny (Health).
Carlos Esplá became the first Minister of Propaganda of Spain, with Sánchez Arcas as undersecretary.

When Juan Negrín formed his first government he eliminated the Ministry of Propaganda, making it a sub-secretariat under the Ministry of State. 
Esplá remained in charge of propaganda.
Later, Sánchez Arcas was appointed undersecretary of propaganda on 22 January 1938 by José Giral, Minister of Foreign Affairs.
He replaced the communist Federico Melchor.
When Negrín formed his new cabinet on 5 April 1938 he made Julio Álvarez del Vayo the Foreign Minister. 
Alvarez del Vayo in turn made Sánchez Arcas head of the Propaganda Subsecretería.
In May 1938 he confirmed Ramos Oliveira as head of the Press Office in the Spanish Embassy in London.
With a serious shortage of foreign currency, Sánchez Arcas took measures to centralize control of the sub secretariat and to reduce costs. 
He dissolved the Servicio Espaňol de Información and personally took charge of correspondence with foreign representatives.
Later he delegated this task to Miguel González, his Head of Publications.
He also proposed to sell books and pamphlets published abroad at a price sufficient to cover costs.

In March 1939 the Republican government faced a rebellion led by Segismundo Casado. 
Prime Minister Juan Negrín and the communist leaders Dolores Ibárruri, Juan Modesto, Enrique Líster and Vicente Uribe flew out of Spain from Monòver airfield in the morning of 6 March 1939. Sánchez Arcas accompanied Negrín.

Later years:1939–1970

Sánchez Arcas went into exile in Russia.
He was appointed Minister in Warsaw by the exiled Spanish Republican government in 1946.
His reports to the exiled government in Paris were closely aligned with Stalinist propaganda.
In the summer of 1947 the PCE withdrew from the exiled government.
Sánchez Arcas's relationship with the government deteriorated, while Poland lost interest in supporting it now there were no communist members.

Sánchez Arcas was among the Spanish delegates to the World Congress of Peace in 1949.
In February 1950 he was forced to resign from his position as Spanish Minister due to a conflict between Stalin and Josip Broz Tito of Yugoslavia, whom the government in exile supported.
Under pressure from Moscow he remained in Warsaw with his wife and daughters. In 1951 he resumed work as an architect in Warsaw. 
In 1954 he was elected a member of the Central Committee of the PCE at the 5th Congress held in Prague.
He later moved to Berlin, where he died in 1970.

Buildings
1931 Hospital Provincial de Toledo, Toledo, Spain
1932 Edificio Rockefeller, Madrid, Spain (with Luis Lacasa)
1932 Central Térmica, Madrid, Spain (with Eduardo Torroja)
1935 Mercado de Algeciras, Algeciras, Spain (with Eduardo Torroja)
1928–36 Hospital Clinico San Carlos de Madrid (with Eduardo Torroja)

Publications
Casos prácticos de estudio de iluminación natural. Instituto Técnico de la Construcción y Edificación. Madrid 193?
Form und Bauweise der Schalen Berlín: VEB Verlag für Bauwesen, 1961
Stadt und Verkehr: Verkehrs- und Stadtplanung in den USA und in Westeuropa. Berlín: Deutsche Bauakademie, 1968
Stadtzentren. Beiträgezur Ungestaltung und Neuplanung. Berlín: Deutsche Bauakademie, 1967, (collective publication)

Notes

Sources

1897 births
1970 deaths
Spanish architects
People of the Spanish Civil War
Exiles of the Spanish Civil War in the Soviet Union